Anna Vyacheslavivna Voloshyna (born 26 September 1991 in Kharkiv) is a Ukrainian synchro swimmer. She has won fifteen medals at the European Championships – including gold in the combination routine (2014) and team free routine (2016) – and a silver as well as nine World bronze medals.

Career
At the 2013 World Aquatics Championships Voloshyna won three bronze medals in team and combination competitions which were also Ukraine's first World Championships medals in synchro swimming.

Voloshyna finished fourth at the solo free routine and solo technical routine at the 2015 World Aquatics Championships. Few days after she won bronze medal in duet free routine in duet with Lolita Ananasova.

The most successful competition for her up to date is 2017 World Aquatics Championships in Budapest, Hungary, where she won a first-ever silver medal for Ukraine in combination, a bronze in team free routine, two bronze medals in pair with Yelyzaveta Yakhno in duet competitions and two bronze medals in solo events. That all made her the best ever Ukrainian synchro swimmer.

References

1991 births
Living people
Ukrainian synchronized swimmers
Olympic synchronized swimmers of Ukraine
Synchronized swimmers at the 2016 Summer Olympics
World Aquatics Championships medalists in synchronised swimming
Synchronized swimmers at the 2011 World Aquatics Championships
Synchronized swimmers at the 2013 World Aquatics Championships
Synchronized swimmers at the 2015 World Aquatics Championships
Synchronized swimmers at the 2017 World Aquatics Championships
European Aquatics Championships medalists in synchronised swimming
Sportspeople from Kharkiv